Sheldwich is a village and civil parish in the far south of the Borough of Swale in Kent, England.

Geography
Other than North Street, Copton and part of Gosmere, the remainder of the parish lies within the Kent Downs, (the eastern part of the North Downs), a designated Area of Outstanding Natural Beauty.
The population of the parish in the 2011 census was 491, a fall of 31 from the 2001 Census. The village name of Sheldwich is unique within the United Kingdom.

Governance

Sheldwich in elections every four years helps to elect one representative to Kent County Council, this is currently:

Sheldwich elects two representatives to Swale Borough Council, currently:

There is also the parish council with delegated responsibilities, such as for trees, litter, parks, some local leisure activities and a planning advisory role.

Lees Court
South east of the settlement of Sheldwich Lees is Lees Court, a listed Grade I country house. It was built 
c.1652 for George Sondes, 1st Earl of Feversham, but destroyed entirely by fire in November 1910 and painstakingly rebuilt in 1912. It was the country seat for many years of the Right Honourable the late Earl Sondes.

It is now subdivided into private apartments, along with the Grade II listed Dairy Court, Estate House, Court Yard, and Stable Yard. It also retains well maintained gardens, parkland and grounds.

The estate, once covering 85,000 acres today covers only 6,900 acres, c. 2,500 acres around the villages of Sheldwich and Badlesmere and the remainder at The Swale Estuary, Oare and Faversham Creeks.

History
In ancient charters it was called 'Schyldwic'.
In 784, it was given this name by Ealhmund of Kent, to Abbot Wetrede and his convent of 'Raculf Cestre', or Reculver.
During King Edward I's reign (1239–1307), it passed to the family of Atte-Lese, which included the Manor of Sheldwich. This then became the Manor of Leescourt due to the name of the Atte-lese family mansion.

In 1367, Sir Richard At-Lese (MP) was an owner of the manor, he was later Sheriff of Kent. He died in 1394.
In King James I's reign, Sir Richard Sondes became the owner and his son Sir George Sondes destroyed a large section of the manor house.
After Sir George, Marquis of Blanquefort inherited the manor. It then stayed under his family control until 1798.

The village church, parts of which are eleventh century, is listed as Grade II*, and is dedicated to St. James. It was extended and extensively restored in 1888.

The village features its manor house, rebuilt almost entirely, lying close to woodland known as Church Plantation. There is also a Primary School, rated as outstanding at the last full assessment.

Because of the small scattered population (491 according to the 2011 census) the civil parish is joined with those of two smaller neighbouring villages, and is known as Sheldwich, Badlesmere and Leaveland. As most of the parish lies within the Kent Downs Area of Outstanding Natural Beauty, planning laws are tight with very little new development permitted since its establishment in the mid-1960s.
Property prices are mostly high as a consequence, supported by a popular and outstanding primary school.

The following are listed structures within the Parish:

Throwley House (Grade II* ) 
Church of St James (Grade II* ) 
Lees Court (Grade I) 
Yew Tree Cottage 
Bier House 30 m SE of Church of St James 
The Manor House 
Dairy Court, Estate House And Courtyard, Lees Court 
Yew Tree Cottage 
Stocks Cottages 
Barn, now converted to residence. 10 m E of The Stocks 
Three Chest Tombs about 10 m S of Chancel of Church of St James 
Colbrahamsole Farmhouse and Garden Wall 
Gates about 5 m E of the Gate House (T.R. 016559) 
Chambers Cottage 
West End 
The Old School and Old School House 
Lords Cottages 
Stable Yard 
The White House 
The Old Post Office and adjoining Post Office Cottage 
The Old Bakery 
Meadow Cottage 
The Old Cottage 
Stable Block About 10 m N of Throwley House 
Little Lords 
Lees Court (Grade I listed)

Economy
There are several listed oast houses, mostly now residential, such as Gosmere Oast (pictured).
The area is almost wholly agricultural with a particularly fine herd of cattle at Badlesmere Court Farm and some sheep. It is also home to Sheldwich Primary School.

References

External links

Villages in Kent
Civil parishes in Kent